Juan Sebastián Cabal and Robert Farah won their second consecutive Grand Slam men's doubles title, defeating Marcel Granollers and Horacio Zeballos in the final, 6–4, 7–5 to win the men's doubles tennis title at the 2019 US Open. Cabal and Farah retained the ATP no. 1 doubles ranking. Mike Bryan, Łukasz Kubot and Nicolas Mahut were also in contention for the top ranking at the start of the tournament.

Mike Bryan and Jack Sock were the defending champions, but chose not to participate together. Bryan played alongside his brother Bob, but lost in the third round to Sock and Jackson Withrow. Sock lost in the quarterfinals to Jamie Murray and Neal Skupski.

Seeds

Draw

Finals

Top half

Section 1

Section 2

Bottom half

Section 3

Section 4

References

External links
Main draw
2019 US Open – Men's draws and results at the International Tennis Federation

Men's Doubles
US Open – Men's Doubles
US Open (tennis) by year – Men's doubles